Dame Clare Mary Louise Francis Gerada, Lady Wessely,  (born November 1959) is a London-based general practitioner who is President of the Royal College of General Practitioners (RCGP) and a former chairperson of the RCGP Council (2010–2013). She has professional interests in mental health and substance misuse.

She is a convenor of the cross-party political movement, More United.

Early life
Gerada was born in Nigeria although her father came from Malta; the family moved to the United Kingdom in 1963. Her father opened a single-handed general practitioner practice in Peterborough.

Medical career
Gerada qualified in medicine at UCL Medical School in 1982. She then trained in psychiatry and worked at the Maudsley Hospital in south London. She qualified as a GP in 1992 and started work in general practice in Lambeth, London, the same year. She cites her main interests of work as being around mental health and substance misuse and has spent over her professional career leading the development of primary care substance (alcohol, drugs) services in England. In 2000, she established the Substance Misuse Unit at the RCGP.

She has also been Director of Primary Care for the National Clinical Governance Team and Senior Medical Advisor to the Department of Health, and is Medical Director of the NHS Practitioner Health Programme, which provides confidential medical advice for doctors and dentists. She is one of the partners in the Hurley Group which runs a number of GP practices and walk-in centres across London.

In November 2010 she became chairperson of the Council of the Royal College of General Practitioners for a three years term of office. She was the college's first female chairperson for 50 years, the previous female chairperson having been Dr Annis Gillie.

In September 2013 she was appointed as the chairperson of Clinical Board, Primary Care Transformation, NHS England (London Region), to take up the position the following month. She resigned from this position in April 2015 so she could speak out against what she calls the Conservatives' "desperate quest for privatisation".

In April 2016, she was elected to the council of the Council of the British Medical Association (BMA).

She established the Practitioner Health Programme to support general practitioners, dentists and other health professionals with mental health and associated issues. In March 2019 The Care Quality Commission rated the service outstanding.

In September 2016 she was named as one of the Liberal Democrats' "new Beveridge group" of advisers. She had been a lifelong supporter of the Labour Party until the 2016 United Kingdom European Union membership referendum.

In March 2019 she was appointed co-chair, with Sir Chris Ham, of the forum to implement the NHS's long-term strategy. In 2019, she established the Primary Care Gambling Service, whose aims are to provide treatment to people with gambling problems. 

Since 2020 she has been Chair of the charity Doctors in Distress,  which aims to reduce suicides amongst doctors and other health care workers. It was set up after the suicide of Dr Jagdip Sidhu, a cardiologist killed himself in 2018.   It exists with the goal of zero suicides amongst doctors by 2025. "DiD have many laudable ways of reaching this target but we have a most urgent priority which is to create a network of facilitated therapeutic spaces where doctors can talk about the emotional impact of their work, gaining support from each other, in a safe, non-stigmatising environment."  
She was a non executive director of University College London Hospitals NHS Foundation Trust until March 2021

Gerada was appointed in April 2021 as an Independent Advisor to address Governance and Clinical Quality to her first role within the private hospital sector with Cygnet Healthcare, an independent provider of mental health services that had acquired Whorlton Hall shortly before an undercover investigation by BBC Panorama in 2019 filmed vulnerable patients being abused. In August 2021, she was announced as RCGP president, succeeding Amanda Howe, and taking up the role on 20 November 2021 for a two-year term.

Media appearances
 In February 2012 she appeared in the BBC Radio 4 series Great Lives, nominating Vera Brittain.
 In February 2013 she was assessed as one of the 100 most powerful women in the United Kingdom by Woman's Hour on BBC Radio 4.
 On 29 March 2013, she appeared on BBC Radio 4s 'Any Questions?' which was broadcast from St. George's Chapel, Chatham.
 On 13 May 2013 she debated the NHS with Chris Skidmore MP on BBC's Daily Politics show. 
 She was named as one of the "top 500 Influential Britons" by The Sunday Times and Debrett's in January 2014, and number 4 in Health.
 On 19 January 2023 she appeared on the BBC  Question Time panel.

Personal life
She is married to Sir Simon Charles Wessely, who became a professor of psychiatry, who was knighted in 2013.

She was one of the first people in the UK to publicly self-isolate when she contracted Coronavirus  during a trip to New York in March 2020.  She described it as  the ‘worst illness I've ever had’.  She gave an interview from home to Good Morning Britain  which entertained viewers when she was interrupted by her phone and her dog.

Awards and honours
 Fellow of the Royal College of General Practitioners
 Member and Honorary Fellow of the Royal College of Psychiatrists
 Fellow of the Royal College of Physicians.
 2012, honorary member of Malta's National Order of Merit.

Gerada was appointed Member of the Order of the British Empire (MBE) in the 2000 Birthday Honours for service to medicine and to drug misusers and Dame Commander of the Order of the British Empire (DBE) in the 2020 Birthday Honours for services to general practice.

References

External links 
 Official website

1959 births
Living people
British general practitioners
British people of Maltese descent
British women medical doctors
Alumni of the UCL Medical School
Fellows of the Royal College of General Practitioners
Fellows of the Royal College of Physicians
Dames Commander of the Order of the British Empire
Fellows of the Royal College of Psychiatrists
Wives of knights